Estalakh Jan (also Romanized as Esţalakh Jān and Esţalkh Jān) is a village in Rahmatabad Rural District, Rahmatabad and Blukat District, Rudbar County, Gilan Province, Iran. At the 2006 census, its population was 834, in 219 families.

References 

Populated places in Rudbar County